A gerbil is a small rodent commonly kept as a pet.

Gerbil may also refer to:

 Gerbillinae, a subfamily of rodents containing relatives of the species kept as a pet
 The Gerbils, an indie rock band from Athens, Georgia
 Pierre-Yves Gerbeau, French businessman, nicknamed the Gerbil by British media
 "Gerbil", song by Filter from Short Bus

See also 
Dyirbal (disambiguation)